is a golf video game developed by Camelot Software Planning and published by Nintendo for the Nintendo 3DS. The game was first announced on February 14, 2013, in a Nintendo Direct presentation. It is the fifth game in the series, and is the first one in a decade, since 2004's Mario Golf: Advance Tour for the Game Boy Advance. The game was initially scheduled for the second half of 2013, but was eventually delayed to May 2014.

Gameplay
World Tour is a golf simulation video game with the basic premise mirroring the basis of golf. Controlling characters from the Mario franchise, the player aims to hit a golf ball with a golf club across a golf course in order to hit it into the target hole in the lowest number of strokes. The game in particular employs an arcade-like approach to golf, emphasizing simple, straightforward controls and faster-paced gameplay over realism. Despite this, some courses are modeled to look like real-life courses, while others are Super Mario themed environments. The game continues to employ the gameplay mechanic of "Super Shots"; when chosen by the player, they allow for extra distance when hitting the ball, although only a limited number of them are allocated per course, creating a strategic aspect to their use.

The game also contains online multiplayer golf tournaments, and a feature to find other players to play golf with.

Reception

World Tour has received generally favorable reviews from critics. Many critics praised the gameplay and online functionality, but criticized the Castle Club mode for being confusing. The game holds an average score of 78 on Metacritic.

Destructoid gave it an 8.5 saying that the learning curve is steep and praised the online multiplayer, but criticized the camera and aiming control. IGN gave World Tour an 8.6 rating, summarizing "You don’t have to be a hardcore golf fan to get hooked on World Tour. It rewards good play, gives plenty to do, and is a great teacher."

References

External links
Official announcement
Official website
Official Japanese website

2014 video games
Camelot Software Planning games
Golf video games
Mario Golf
Nintendo 3DS games
Nintendo 3DS-only games
Nintendo 3DS eShop games
Nintendo Network games
Video games developed in Japan
Video games scored by Motoi Sakuraba
Video games with downloadable content
Multiplayer online games
Multiplayer and single-player video games